Jill Dixon (born 1935) is an English actress.

Personal life and career
Jill Dixon was born in England in 1935. She made her debut as an actress at the age of three, appearing as a water nymph at the London Hippodrome. Although she appeared in several films, the majority of Dixon's career were parts in television series and television films. Her last film was the 1964 horror film Witchcraft co-starring Lon Chaney, Diane Clare and Jack Hedley. Dixon also acted in various Shakespeare stage productions including Much Ado About Nothing, King Lear and Love's Labour's Lost.

Filmography
 Shop Spoiled (1954) as Jenny the maid
 Up in the World (1956) as Sylvia
 Checkpoint (1956) as Stewardess
 The Secret Place (1957) as Joan (uncredited)
 High Tide at Noon (1957) as Matille Trudeau
 Just My Luck (1957) as Anne
 A Night to Remember (1958) as Mrs Clarke
 Witchcraft (1964) as Tracy Lanier

TV
 The Queen Came By – TV film (1955) as Kitty Tape
 The Merry Wives of Windsor – TV film (1955) as Anne Page
 ITV Play of the Week – TV series, 2 episodes (1957) as Petra/Doris
 Good Wives – TV series, 5 episodes (1958) as Amy
 Our Mutual Friend – TV series, 5 episodes  (1958–1959) as  Miss Lavinia Wilfer
 Sunday Night Theatre – TV series, 2 episodes (1960) as Diddo Geiss/Bunty Mainwaring
 An Age of Kings – TV series, 2 episodes (1960) as Queen Anne/Lady Anne
 Persuasion – TV series, 3 episodes  (1960–1) as Louisa Musgrove
 The Amazing Dr. Clitterhouse – TV film (1962) as Nurse Ann
 Thirty-Minute Theatre – TV series, 1 episode (1962)
 The Spread of the Eagle – TV mini series, 1 episode (1963) as Charmian
 Sergeant Cork – TV series, 1 episode (1964) as Emma Snedden
 The Man in Room 17 – TV series, 1 episode (1965) as  Moira Leigh
 The Arthur Haynes Show – TV series, 1 episode (1965) 
 Theatre 625 – TV series, 1 episode (1965) as Emily Jackson
 Love Story – TV series, 1 episode (1967) as Myra
 My Man Joe – TV series, 1 episode (1967)
 Armchair Theatre – TV series, 1 episode (1968) as  Audrey Nash
 Sanctuary – TV series, 1 episode (1967) as Hilary
 Best of Enemies – TV series, 1 episode (1969) as  Rowena Gordon 
 Parkin's Patch – TV series, 1 episode (1970) as Mrs. Jackson
 Hadleigh – TV series, 1 episode (1971) as   Nicola Penn 
 Paul Temple – TV series, 1 episode  (1971) as  Liz
 The Capone Investment – TV series, 4 episodes (1974) as Abigail
 Softly, Softly: Taskforce – TV series, 1 episode (1976) as Doris
 East Lynne – TV film (1976) as  Barbara Hare
 Jubilee – TV series, 1 episode (1977) as Anne Tallwatch
 Crown Court – TV series, 1 episode (1977) as  Tanith Grant 
 Grange Hill – TV series, 5 episodes (1978–9) as Miss Clarke
 The Professionals – TV series, 1 episode  (1980) as Amanda's Mother
 Ladykillers – TV series, 1 episode (1981) as  Edith Mabel Pegler

External links 
 

1935 births
Living people
English television actresses
Royal Shakespeare Company members